Hintermaier is a German surname. Notable people with the surname include:

Christl Hintermaier (born 1946), German alpine skier
Reinhold Hintermaier (born 1956), Austrian footballer

German-language surnames